The 2019–20 season was Liverpool Football Club's 128th season in existence and the club's 58th consecutive season in the top flight of English football. Liverpool also competed in the FA Cup, EFL Cup, FA Community Shield, UEFA Champions League, UEFA Super Cup and the FIFA Club World Cup. The season was suspended from 13 March to 17 June due to the COVID-19 pandemic.

Having finished second in the 2018–19 Premier League, Liverpool contested the 2019 FA Community Shield against domestic treble winners Manchester City, losing 5–4 on penalties after a 1–1 draw. As winners of the 2018–19 UEFA Champions League, they contested the 2019 UEFA Super Cup against Chelsea, winning 5–4 on penalties after a 2–2 draw. The victory was Liverpool's fourth in the annual contest; only Barcelona and A.C. Milan have more wins, with five titles apiece.

Liverpool were eliminated in the quarter-finals of the 2019–20 EFL Cup by Aston Villa after fielding a vastly inexperienced side, managed by Liverpool under-23 manager Neil Critchley, while the first-team squad participated in the 2019 FIFA Club World Cup in Qatar under Klopp. Having finished as runners-up on three previous occasions, Liverpool won their first world title after defeating Brazilian club Flamengo 1–0 in the final after extra time, making them the first English side to win the international treble of the UEFA Champions League, UEFA Super Cup and FIFA Club World Cup. Liverpool were unsuccessful in their defence of the UEFA Champions League, exiting the competition in the round of 16 following a 4–2 aggregate defeat across two legs after extra time to Atlético Madrid.

On 25 June, Liverpool clinched their nineteenth league title – the first since 1989–90 and the first during the Premier League era. Upon winning the league, Liverpool claimed the unusual achievement of winning the Premier League earlier than any other team by games played (with seven remaining) and later than any other team by date (being the only team to clinch the title in June).

Over the season, Liverpool set a number of other English top-flight records, including the most consecutive home wins (24; of which 7 were carried over from the previous season) and the biggest point lead at any time (25). They also matched the Premier League records for the most wins (32) the most home wins (18), and the most consecutive wins (18). Beginning the season prior, Liverpool enjoyed a 44-match unbeaten run in the league, the second-longest streak in top-flight history, behind Arsenal's run of 49 games between May 2003 to October 2004. The team remained unbeaten at home in the league for the third season in a row and finished the season with 99 points, the club's record and the second highest in English top-flight history after Manchester City's 100 two years prior. Liverpool also recorded the best ever start to a season in the history of the top 5 leagues in Europe (as they stood in 2020), picking up 20 wins and 1 draw for a total of 61 points out of a possible of 63; they eventually extended that record to 26 wins and 1 draw for a total of 79 points out of a possible 81 before suffering their first league defeat on 29 February 2020.

First-team squad
As of 26 July 2020

New contracts

Transfers and loans

Transfers in

Transfers out

Loans out

Transfer summary

Spending

Summer:  £ 3,000,000

Winter:  £ 7,250,000

Total:  £ 10,250,000

Income

Summer:  £ 43,250,000

Winter:  £ 3,200,000

Total:  £ 46,450,000

Net Expenditure

Summer:  £ 40,250,000

Winter:  £ 4,050,000

Total:  £ 36,200,000

Friendlies

Pre-season
In June 2019, Liverpool announced their pre-season schedule.

Mid-season

Competitions

Overall

Overview

{| class="wikitable" style="text-align: center"
|-
!rowspan=2|Competition
!colspan=8|Record
|-
!
!
!
!
!
!
!
!
|-
| Premier League

|-
| FA Cup

|-
| EFL Cup

|-
| FA Community Shield

|-
| FIFA Club World Cup

|-
| UEFA Super Cup

|-
| UEFA Champions League

|-
! Total

FA Community Shield

UEFA Super Cup

FIFA Club World Cup

Premier League

League table

Results summary

Results by matchday

Matches
On 13 June 2019, the Premier League fixtures were announced.

FA Cup 

Liverpool entered the competition in the third round. The draw for the third round was made on 2 December 2019. The fourth round draw was made by Alex Scott and David O'Leary on Monday, 6 January 2020. The draw for the fifth round was made on 27 January 2020.

EFL Cup 

Liverpool entered the competition in the third round. The draw was confirmed on 28 August 2019, live on Sky Sports. The draw for the fourth round was made on 25 September. The quarter-final draw was conducted on 31 October, live on BBC Radio 2.

UEFA Champions League 

Liverpool entered the competition in the group stage.

Group stage

The draw for the group stage was held on 29 August 2019.

Knockout phase

The draw for the round of 16 was confirmed on 16 December.

Round of 16

Squad statistics

Appearances
Players with no appearances are not included on the list.

Goals

Assists
Not all goals have an assist.

Clean sheets

Disciplinary record

Club awards

End-of-season award

Standard Chartered Men's Player of the Season: Jordan Henderson

Liverpool Standard Chartered Player of the Month award

Awarded monthly to the player that was chosen by fans voting on Liverpoolfc.com

References

Further reading 

Liverpool F.C. seasons
Liverpool
Liverpool
English football championship-winning seasons
Liverpool
FIFA Club World Cup-winning seasons